The Trout Pool is a mid 19th century painting by Worthington Whittredge. Done in oil on canvas, the painting depicts a fishing pond amid a dense forestscape. Whittredge's work is currently in the collection of the Metropolitan Museum of Art.

References 

1870 paintings
Paintings in the collection of the Metropolitan Museum of Art
Water in art